Andrea Joy Campbell (born June 11, 1982) is an American lawyer and politician who is the Attorney General of Massachusetts. She is also a former member of the Boston City Council. On the city council, she represented District 4, which includes parts of Boston's Dorchester, Mattapan, Jamaica Plain, and Roslindale neighborhoods. A member of the Democratic Party, she was first elected to the council in November 2015 and assumed office in January 2016. She served as president of the council from January 2018 until January 2020.

In September 2020, Campbell launched an unsuccessful campaign for mayor of Boston in 2021. Campbell placed third in the September 14 primary behind Annissa Essaibi George and Michelle Wu, the latter of whom would go on to win the general election. In 2022, Campbell was elected to serve as the attorney general of Massachusetts.

Education and early career
Campbell graduated from Boston Latin School. She matriculated at Princeton University, and, following graduation, enrolled at the UCLA School of Law where she would earn her J.D. She began her legal career working for a nonprofit in Roxbury that provided free legal services pertaining to education rights and access to education. She later worked as deputy legal counsel to Governor Deval Patrick.

Boston City Council

In the 2015 Boston City Council election, first-time candidate Campbell placed first in the 4th district's preliminary election and went on to defeat 16-term incumbent Charles Yancey in the general election with 61% of the vote. Campbell was re-elected in November 2017, having run unopposed. On December 9, 2017, Campbell announced that she had unanimous support of her colleagues to be the next president of the council. She was elected council president on January 1, 2018. Campbell was the first African-American woman to hold the position. She won re-election to the council in November 2019, and was succeeded as president by Kim Janey in January 2020. Campbell did not run for reelection to the council in 2021, as she instead opted to run for mayor.

Campbell was a supporter of voting "yes" on the Massachusetts Charter School Expansion Initiative referendum in 2016. The referendum was heavily defeated by voters.

In April 2018, during her City Council presidency, Boston magazine ranked Campbell 51st on its list of the "100 Most Influential People in Boston". The magazine wrote that political insiders anticipated a continued political ascent for Campbell. She was one of only three city councilors included in these rankings, joined by Ayanna Pressley (ranked 20th after having won a upset primary election victory that made her poised to be elected to the U.S. House of Representatives) and Michelle Wu (ranked 31st)

In 2019, as City Council president, Campbell proposed an ordinance to create a city inspector general. Mayor Marty Walsh came out in opposition to it. The ordinance was rejected by the City Council in a 9–4 vote. Also in 2019, Campbell and fellow councilor Matt O'Malley proposed the idea of a vacancy tax on abandoned residential and commercial properties.

In June 2020, Campbell was one of the five city councilors in the minority that voted against Mayor Walsh's $3.61 billion operating budget proposal. She argued that it failed to include changes necessary for the city to address its racial inequality and systemic racism. That month, when Walsh announced the creation of a philanthropic fund focused on racial inequities, Campbell was somewhat critical. While she supported the creation of the fund itself and acknowledged that she believed philanthropy could play an important role, she argued that it was more important for the city to focus its own budget on such problems. Campbell was also critical of Walsh's coinciding move to create a new cabinet position within his administration dedicated to query and inclusion, considering it a "duplicative position" and criticizing Walsh for not instead other "actionable ideas" to "transform inequitable systems" that had been proposed to Walsh by her and others.

In July 2020, amid the George Floyd protests, Campbell proposed an ordinance to create a police oversight board. Ultimately, the Boston City Council voted later that year to approve a different ordinance creating an Office of Police Accountability that features a civilian police review board and oversight panel for internal affairs, which Mayor Walsh signed into law.

In 2021, Campbell, with fellow councilor Kim Janey, proposed an ordinance that would have banned almost all employers in Boston from running credit checks on job seekers, arguing that credit checks are most detrimental to low-income applicants.

In May 2021, the City Council passed an ordinance by Campbell and Ricardo Arroyo which limits the use of crowd control weapons by officers of the Boston Police Department. Acting Mayor Kim Janey signed the ordinance into law. The ordinance had previously been passed by the City Council in December 2020, but had been vetoed by Mayor Marty Walsh in January 2021.

, Campbell served on several council committees, including Community Preservation Act, Public Safety & Criminal Justice, Rules and Administration, and Whole.

2021 mayoral campaign

On September 24, 2020, Campbell announced her candidacy in the 2021 Boston mayoral election from her childhood home in Roxbury. In an announcement video that was released, she declared, "I’m running for mayor, because every neighborhood deserves real change and a real chance." Campbell's mayoral campaign launch followed the launch of her council colleague Michelle Wu's own campaign for mayor earlier that month.

During her campaign, Campbell was critical of Acting Mayor Kim Janey, who was also a candidate in the election. Campbell held press conferences criticizing Janey on various topics, including urging her to release legal documents related to a police scandal and to make greater cuts to the city's police department budget. In early August, Campbell called for Janey to put in place rules which would require that many businesses require patrons provide proof of vaccination. Campbell also criticized Janey for having, per her criticism, waited too long to put in place a vaccine mandate for city employees.

Campbell received the endorsement of the Boston Globe editorial board.

As a candidate for mayor, Campbell was supportive of safe consumption sites for illegal drugs as a tool for addressing drug addiction in the city and encouraging recovery. These would be similar to supervised injection sites. She would later reverse her support for these when she ran for attorney general the following year.

Ahead of the primary election, a super PAC associated with UNITE HERE Local 26, supporting Kim Janey's candidacy, ran a negative radio advertisement against Campbell which attacked her past support for charter school expansion, and which alleged that Campbell was "supported by special interests that want to take money from our schools, and give it to other schools that discriminate against kids with special needs". The latter accusation was seen as alluding to the fact that a super PAC supporting Campbell's candidacy received funding from wealthy charter school proponents, such as Reed Hastings. Campbell publicly took issue with the characterization of her in this ad, and urged Janey to disavow it, which Janey did not. Janey's campaign manager accused Campbell of being a hypocrite, characterizing Campbell's campaign as being entirely, "based on negative political attacks on Mayor Janey".

Campbell delivered a concession speech on the night of the nonpartisan mayoral primary, despite extremely little of the vote having yet been officially reported. Once the votes were counted, Campbell had finished third in the primary, meaning that she did not advance to the general election.

Following her loss, Campbell stated that she would have a publicly transparent process in contemplating which general election candidate (Annissa Essaibi George or Michelle Wu) to endorse, if any. She stated that she would seek firm commitments to the Black community to be made by any candidate she might endorsed. She ultimately gave no endorsement to either remaining candidate.

Attorney general of Massachusetts

2022 campaign 

On February 2, 2022, Campbell announced her candidacy for Massachusetts Attorney General in the 2022 election. Campbell's announcement came after incumbent Attorney General Maura Healey announced that she would not seek reelection and run for governor of Massachusetts instead.

Campbell's inclusion on the ballot for the election's Democratic primary made her the first black woman in the history of Massachusetts to qualify for inclusion on the ballot for a statewide election. Healey endorsed Campbell in August, prior to the primary election. Campbell won the Democratic nomination and, in the general election, was elected to serve as attorney general. She is the first black woman to hold the office, and the second black person to hold the office, after only Edward Brooke.

Tenure

Campbell took office on January 18, 2023.

Personal life 
Campbell was born in Boston. Her mother and father died when she was at a young age; she refers to an aunt and uncle as her parents. When she was 29, her twin brother, who suffered from scleroderma, died while in state custody awaiting trial. Her other brother, Alvin, is an alleged serial rapist currently awaiting trial on nine sexual assault charges. Campbell's husband is Matthew Scheier. They have two sons, Alexander and Aiden. Campbell lives in the Mattapan neighborhood of Boston.

Electoral history

City Council

 write-in votes

Mayor

Attorney General

References

Further reading

External links
 Government website
 Campaign website
 Past (Boston City Council) webpage

|-

|-

1982 births
20th-century African-American people
20th-century African-American women
21st-century African-American politicians
21st-century African-American women
21st-century American politicians
21st-century American women politicians
African-American city council members in Massachusetts
African-American women in politics
Boston City Council members
Candidates in the 2021 United States elections
Lawyers from Boston
Living people
Massachusetts Attorneys General
People from Mattapan
Princeton University alumni
UCLA School of Law alumni
Women city councillors in Massachusetts
21st-century American women lawyers
21st-century American lawyers
African-American women lawyers